Delbert Ray Fulkerson (August 14, 1924 – January 10, 1976) was an American mathematician who co-developed the FordFulkerson algorithm, one of the most well-known algorithms to solve the maximum flow problem in networks.

Early life and education
D. R. Fulkerson was born in Tamms, Illinois, the third of six children of Elbert and Emma Fulkerson. Fulkerson became an undergraduate at Southern Illinois University. His academic career was interrupted by military service during World War II. Having returned to complete his degree after the war, he went on to do a Ph.D. in mathematics at the University of Wisconsin–Madison under the supervision of Cyrus MacDuffee, who was a student of L. E. Dickson. Fulkerson received his Ph.D. in 1951.

Career
After graduation, Fulkerson joined the mathematics department at the RAND Corporation. In 1956, he and L. R. Ford Jr. described the Ford–Fulkerson algorithm. In 1962 they produced a book-length description of their method.

In 1971 he moved to Cornell University as the Maxwell Upson Professor of Engineering. He was diagnosed with Crohn's disease and was limited in his teaching. In despair, he committed suicide in 1976.

Fulkerson was the supervisor of Jon Folkman at RAND and Tatsuo Oyama at GRIPS. After Folkman committed suicide in 1969, Fulkerson blamed himself for failing to notice Folkman's suicidal behaviors.

In 1979, the renowned Fulkerson Prize was established which is now awarded every three years for outstanding papers in discrete mathematics jointly by the Mathematical Programming Society and the American Mathematical Society.

See also
 Out-of-kilter algorithm
 List of people diagnosed with Crohn's disease

References

External links
Delbert Ray Fulkerson prize
Fulkerson biography at Cornell

 Biography of D. R. Fulkerson from the Institute for Operations Research and the Management Sciences

20th-century American mathematicians
Combinatorialists
1924 births
1976 suicides
University of Wisconsin–Madison College of Letters and Science alumni
RAND Corporation people
People from Alexander County, Illinois
Mathematicians from Illinois
1976 deaths
People with Crohn's disease
Suicides in New York (state)